Nether Peover is a civil parish in Cheshire West and Chester, England. It contains twelve buildings that are recorded in the National Heritage List for England as designated listed buildings.  St Oswald's Church is listed at Grade I; all the others are at Grade II.  Apart from the village of Lower Peover, the parish is almost completely rural.  This is reflected in the listed buildings which, apart from the church and its associated structures and the adjacent school, are either domestic buildings or related to farming.

Key

Buildings

See also
Listed buildings in Peover Inferior
Listed buildings in Peover Superior
Listed buildings in Allostock
Listed buildings in Lach Dennis
Listed buildings in Plumley

References
Citations

Sources

Listed buildings in Cheshire West and Chester
Lists of listed buildings in Cheshire